Sir John Bilsland Bailey  (5 November 1928 – 22 February 2021) was a British solicitor and public servant.

Bailey was born to Walter Bailey (died 1932) and the composer Ethel Edith Bilsland, who married secondly Sir Thomas George Spencer, a telecommunications executive. He was educated at Eltham College and graduated from University College London with a law degree and was admitted as a solicitor in 1954. He was appointed an Under-Secretary in the Treasury Solicitor's Department in 1973, and then served as Legal Director of the Office of Fair Trading between 1977 and 1979, when he became Deputy Treasury Solicitor. He was promoted in 1984 to be HM Procurator General and Treasury Solicitor, serving until 1988.

Bailey was appointed a Companion of the Order of the Bath in the 1982 New Year Honours, and he was promoted to Knight Commander in the 1987 Birthday Honours. He died on 22 February 2021, at the age of 92.

References 

1928 births
2021 deaths
English solicitors
Alumni of University College London
Knights Commander of the Order of the Bath
Place of birth missing
Place of death missing
People educated at Eltham College
Treasury Solicitors